Robert James Blattner (6 August 1931 – 13 June 2015) was a mathematics professor at UCLA working on harmonic analysis, representation theory,  and geometric quantization, who introduced Blattner's conjecture. Born in Milwaukee, Blattner received his bachelor's degree from Harvard University in 1953 and his Ph.D. from the University of Chicago in 1957. He joined the UCLA mathematics department in 1957 and remained on the staff until his retirement as professor emeritus in 1992.

Blattner was a visiting scholar at the Institute for Advanced Study in 1964–65.
In 2012 he became a fellow of the American Mathematical Society.

References

1931 births
2015 deaths
20th-century American mathematicians
21st-century American mathematicians
Harvard University alumni
University of Chicago alumni
University of California, Los Angeles faculty
Institute for Advanced Study visiting scholars
Fellows of the American Mathematical Society